Sir John Newell Jordan  (5 September 1852 – 14 September 1925) was a British diplomat.

Early life and career
Jordan was born in Balloo, County Down, Ireland, the son of John Jordan, a wealthy Presbyterian farmer, and his wife Mary (née Newell). He apparently never lost his Ulster accent. He was educated at the Royal Belfast Academical Institution, Queen's College, Belfast and Queen's College, Cork. In 1876 he joined the Chinese Consular Service as a student interpreter. He held various posts in South China before being appointed Chinese Secretary at the British Legation in Peking in 1891.

In 1896 he was appointed Consul-General at Seoul, Korea, becoming Chargé d'affaires in 1898 and Minister-Resident in August 1901. He remained there until November 1905, being appointed Knight Commander of the Order of St Michael and St George (KCMG) in 1904. Jordan received the Queen Victoria Jubilee Medal in 1897 followed by the King Edward VII Coronation Medal in 1902.

Ambassadorial career
In 1906 he was appointed HM Envoy Extraordinary and Minister Plenipotentiary to China as the successor to Sir Ernest Satow and remained in the post until his retirement in 1920. He was appointed Knight Commander of the Order of the Bath (KCB) in the 1909 Birthday Honours and in 1910 received the Freedom of the City of Belfast at the same ceremony as the Scottish-American industrialist Andrew Carnegie. Jordan was appointed Knight Grand Commander of the Order of the Indian Empire (GCIE) in 1911, and Knight Grand Cross of the Order of St Michael and St George (GCMG) in the 1920 Birthday Honours shortly after his retirement. He was also appointed to the Privy Council in 1915, entitling him to the style "The Right Honourable". In 1920, Jordan became a director of the Chartered Bank of India, Australia and China.

Jordan, despite his retirement, was a delegate to the Washington Naval Conference of 1921–1922.

Personal life and family

In 1885, Jordan married Annie Howe Cromie (1849–1939), the eldest child of Dr Robert Cromie JP (1813–1901), the ruling elder of Clough Presbyterian church, a general practitioner and the local registrar of births and deaths, and his wife Ann Jane (née Henry; 1823–1899) of Ballyhosset, near Ardglass.

They had four children: three sons and a daughter. Dr John Herbert Jordan MC (1887–1949) was head of the Department of Public Health in Shanghai. Edith Mary Jordan (1890–1918) was married in 1911 to Lieutenant-General Sir Travers Clarke (1871-1962) and died in the 'flu pandemic seven years later. Robert Cromie "Bob" Jordan (1891–1966) worked as a young man in the Hong Kong and Shanghai Bank in Shanghai, before contracting polio.

Sir John and Lady Jordan were keen Sinophiles and collectors. Part of their extensive collection of ornate oriental carvings, jade, silver, ivories, textiles, porcelain, paintings and teapots was bequeathed to Bangor Borough Council by their son Bob and now form part of the collections of the North Down Museum.

Legacy 

At his death he left estate valued at £39,409.

Jordan Road in Hong Kong's Kowloon District is named after him.

Notes

Footnotes

References
Biography, Oxford Dictionary of National Biography
 

1852 births
1925 deaths
People from County Down
Alumni of Queen's University Belfast
Knights Grand Cross of the Order of St Michael and St George
Knights Grand Commander of the Order of the Indian Empire
Knights Commander of the Order of the Bath
Members of the Privy Council of the United Kingdom
Alumni of Queens College Cork
Ambassadors of the United Kingdom to Korea
Ambassadors of the United Kingdom to China
19th-century British diplomats
20th-century British diplomats